Rhodes Street Historic District is a residential historic district encompassing one block of Rhodes Street in southern Providence, Rhode Island, along with the dead-end Janes and Alphonso Streets.  This area has a well-preserved collection of stylish 19th century houses, built roughly between 1850 and 1895.  South Providence did not see much residential development until after industry began moving into the area.  These houses were built on land that was originally part of the Rhodes family farm, and were built for managers of nearby industrial facilities.  Architecturally the houses represent a cross-section of styles popular in the period.

The district was listed on the National Register of Historic Places in 1982.

See also
National Register of Historic Places listings in Providence, Rhode Island

References

External links

Historic districts in Providence County, Rhode Island
Geography of Providence, Rhode Island
National Register of Historic Places in Providence, Rhode Island
Historic districts on the National Register of Historic Places in Rhode Island